Kolomytsevo is a rural locality (a selo) and the administrative center of Kolomytsevskoye Rural Settlement, Liskinsky District, Voronezh Oblast, Russia. The population was 831 as of 2010. There are 12 streets.

Geography 
Kolomytsevo is located 18 km south of Liski (the district's administrative centre) by road. Popasnoye is the nearest rural locality.

References 

Rural localities in Liskinsky District